SCAW may refer to:

Sleeping Children Around the World
Students Coalition Against War

See also
 The Scaw
 Skaw (disambiguation)